The Lake Charles Ice Pirates were an American ice hockey team in Lake Charles, Louisiana. They played in the Western Professional Hockey League from 1997-2001.

Season-by-season record

Records
Games Billy Lund 277
Goals John Hanson 121
Assists Billy Lund 189
Points Billy Lund 281
PIM Darcy Verot 505

Notable players
Tracey Katelnikoff
Dennis Maruk
Nolan McDonald
Graeme Townshend
Darcy Verot
Cody Duplechin

External links
 The Internet Hockey Database

Ice hockey teams in Louisiana
I